USS Sausalito (PF-4), was a  patrol frigate in commission from 1944 to 1945 and from 1950 to 1952, was the only ship of the United States Navy to be named for Sausalito, California. She also served in the Soviet Navy as EK-16 and in the Republic of Korea Navy as ROKS Imchin (PF-66).

Construction and commissioning
Sausalito was laid down on 7 April 1943, as a patrol gunboat, PG-112, under a Maritime Commission (MARCOM) contract, MC hull No. 1422, at Permanente Metals Richmond Shipyard #4, Richmond, California; reclassified as a patrol frigate, PF-4, on 15 April 1943, she was launched on 20 July 1943, sponsored by Mrs. Richard Shaler, and commissioned on 4 March 1944.

Service history

U.S. Navy, World War II, 1944–1945
After shakedown, Sausalito arrived at Adak, Territory of Alaska, on 5 October 1944 for convoy escort duty in the Alaskan Sea Frontier. She performed these duties until – having been selected for transfer to the Soviet Navy in Project Hula, a secret program for the transfer of US Navy ships to the Soviet Navy at Cold Bay, Alaska, in anticipation of the Soviet Union joining the war against Japan – she departed on 5 June 1945, for overhaul at Seattle, Washington, to prepare her for transfer. She then proceeded to Cold Bay and began training her new Soviet crew.

Soviet Navy, 1945–1949
Commissioned into the Soviet Navy immediately, Sausalito was designated as a storozhevoi korabl ("escort ship") and renamed EK-16 in Soviet service. She soon departed Cold Bay, bound for Petropavlovsk-Kamchatsky, in the Soviet Union, and served as a patrol vessel in the Soviet Far East.

In February 1946, the United States began negotiations for the return of ships loaned to the Soviet Union for use during World War II. On 8 May 1947, United States Secretary of the Navy James V. Forrestal informed the United States Department of State that the United States Department of the Navy wanted 480 of the 585 combatant ships it had transferred to the Soviet Union for World War II use returned, EK-16 among them. Negotiations for the return of the ships were protracted, but on 1 November 1949 the Soviet Union finally returned EK-16 to the US Navy at Yokosuka, Japan.

U.S. Navy, Korean War, 1950–1952
Reverting to her original name, Sausalito was placed in reserve at Yokosuka. With the outbreak of the Korean War on 25 June 1950, the U.S. Navy needed additional escort vessels, and on 15 September 1950, Sausalito was recommissioned at Yokosuka. On 26 November 1950, she departed Yokosuka for Hŭngnam, North Korea. There, until 24 December 1950, she performed harbor control duties, which included escorting ships through the mineswept channel, passing instructions to ships entering the harbor, patrolling the entrance against hostile craft and drifting naval mines, and conducting shore bombardment when required.

Between February and May 1951, Sausalitos assignments included escorting the battleship  on her shore bombardment station, blockade patrols, shore bombardment on the east coast of North Korea from Wonsan to Chongjin, and harbor control duty at Wonsan, broken by periods of upkeep at Sasebo and Yokosuka, Japan. Between June and August 1951, she escorted underway replenishment groups off the Korean coast.

After drydocking and upkeep at Yokosuka, Sausalito departed for the Philippine Islands, in October 1951. In late November and early December 1951, she conducted a patrol against unauthorized fishing vessels in the Sonsorol Islands, in the western Caroline Islands, apprehending one vessel. After spending Christmas 1951, in Subic Bay, on Luzon, she made a good-will tour to Saigon, South Vietnam; Bangkok, Thailand; Singapore; and Penang, Federation of Malaya. February 1952, found her back in Korean waters, where she resumed escort and patrol duties before returning to Yokosuka, for the last time under the United States flag on 31 May 1952. The US Navy decommissioned Sausalito on 9 June 1952.

Republic of Korea Navy, 1952–1973
On 4 September 1952, the United States transferred the ship, on loan, to the Republic of Korea for service in the Republic of Korea Navy as ROKS Imchin (PF-66).  She replaced another Tacoma-class patrol frigate, the South Korean ship ROKS Apnok, ex-, which had been irreparably damaged in a collision on 21 May 1951.

Imchin was scrapped in 1973.

Awards
The US Navy awarded Sausalito six battle stars for her Korean War service.

Notes

References

Bibliography

External links 
 
 hazegray.org: USS Sausalito

Tacoma-class frigates
Ships built in Richmond, California
1943 ships
World War II frigates and destroyer escorts of the United States
Tacoma-class frigates of the Soviet Navy
World War II frigates of the Soviet Union
Cold War frigates of the Soviet Union
Cold War frigates and destroyer escorts of the United States
Korean War frigates and destroyer escorts of the United States
Tacoma-class frigates of the Republic of Korea Navy
Korean War frigates of South Korea
Ships transferred under Project Hula
Sausalito, California